Twelve: Fifty One is the second album released by pop-acoustic duo Krissy & Ericka under the label MCA Music.

The album's promotional single, "12:51", charted on the Philippine Charts and debuted at 6.

The album was only available in Philippines, Singapore and Malaysia After 1 week of release. Krissy and Ericka were also featured on Candy, and there they were interviewed more about their album.

Singles
The single "12:51" was the official lead single and promotional single for the album.

Reception

Critical response
The album received favorable reviews. A review on Spin or Bin stated that the reviewers liked the album and were looking forward to hearing more original music from the duo, rating it 3.5 stars. Pop Culture rated the album 3 out of 5 stars, questioning the originality of the group's style of covering songs in an acoustic style and noting that the album has "not much in terms of guitar work, but a lot in terms of their honeyed voices."

Track listing
Most of the songs recorded were their own covers of some popular songs, by artists such as Adele, Katy Perry, and Taylor Swift.

References

2012 albums